Supreme director (in Spanish director supremo) was a title used to designate certain heads of state in Latin America
 The Supreme Director of the United Provinces of the Río de la Plata (modern Argentina), from 1814 to 1820. 
 The Supreme Director of Chile, from 1814 to 1826, except for the period of Royalist rule from 1814 to 1817.
 The Supreme Director of Nicaragua, from 1838 to 1854.